The Hugga Bunch was a 1980s toy line from the Kenner, Parker Brothers companies and Hallmark Cards. Starting in early 1985, the companies manufactured the Hugga Bunch dolls, each of which held a smaller doll called a "huglet" in their arms.  During that year, the line generated over US$40 million in sales.

The title characters in the franchise lived in a place called "Huggaland".

Film

The toys inspired The Hugga Bunch, a 1985 television film produced by Filmfair Communications.

Written by David Swift and directed by Gus Jekel, it earned a Primetime Emmy Award for Outstanding Visual Effects. Produced for US$1.4 million, it was the most expensive TV special ever produced at the time. Along with a making-of special, it was released on VHS, LaserDisc and Beta by Vestron Video's Children's Video Library. To date, it has not been released on DVD and/or Blu-ray.

Plot

In the film, a girl travels through her mirror into HuggaLand to find a way to keep her grandmother—the only one who knows how to hug—young.

Cast
 Gennie James - Bridget Severson
 Natalie Masters - Grams Severson
 Terry Castillo - Huggins
 Tony Urbano - Hugsy
 Aarika Wells - Queen Admira
 Carl Steven - Andrew Severson
 Susan Mullen - Janet Severson
 Mark Withers - Parker Severson
 Kelly Britt - Aunt Ruth
 Richard Haydn - Bookworm (voice)

A Day Full of Hugs
Also in 1985, Parker Brothers released an album. Singers included Jonathan Edwards, Bradley Kane, Russell Horton, Michael Mark, Jessica Craven, Merle Miller, Terry Teszor, John Henry Kurtz, Stephen and Tom Chapin.

References

External links
 

1985 television films
1985 films
American children's films
Films based on toys
Star Comics titles
1980s toys
Doll brands
1980s American films